Rear-Admiral William Shaun Truelove  is a Royal Canadian Navy officer.

He joined the Navy in 1981 and obtained a degree at Royal Roads Military College.

He was promoted to Rear-Admiral in May 2012 and took command of Maritime Forces Pacific in June 2012. In 2015 he was appointed as Commander, Canadian Defence Liaison Council in Washington.

He was invested as an officer of the Order of Military Merit in 2009 and promoted to commander of the order in 2016.

Awards and decorations
Truelove's personal awards and decorations include the following:

100px

25pxFile:CPSM Ribbon.png

110px

 He was a qualified Paratrooper and as such wore the Canadian Forces Jump Wings

References

External links

Year of birth missing (living people)
Living people
Commanders of the Order of Military Merit (Canada)
Canadian admirals